Colonel Thomas Butler of Garryricken (died 1738), also known as Thomas Butler of Kilcash was an Irish Jacobite soldier. He commanded a regiment, Thomas Butler's foot, during the Williamite War and fought at the Battle of Aughrim in 1691 where he was taken captive. His son John would, de jure, become the 15th Earl of Ormond.

Birth and origins 
Thomas was probably born at Garryricken, near Callan, County Kilkenny, as the eldest son of Walter Butler and his wife Mary Plunkett. His father, known as Walter Butler of Garryricken (died 1700), belonged to a cadet branch of the Butler Dynasty, being the son of Richard Butler of Kilcash (died 1701), who was a younger brother of the 1st Duke of Ormond. Thomas's father had built Garryricken House around 1660. The Butler dynasty is an Old English family that descends from Theobald Walter, who had been appointed Chief Butler of Ireland by King Henry II in 1177.

Thomas's mother was the only daughter of Christopher Plunkett, 2nd Earl of Fingall.

Thomas is known as Thomas Butler of Garryricken or as Thomas Butler of Kilcash because he lived at Kilcash Castle and owned half of the Garryricken Manor; his brother John had the other half and lived at Garryricken House.

Williamite War 
He fought for James II during the Williamite War in Ireland, being the colonel of an infantry regiment, known as "Thomas Butler's Foot". Colonel Thomas Butler was taken prisoner at the Battle of Aughrim in 1691.

Marriage and children 
In 1696, he married Margaret Burke, eldest daughter of William Burke, 7th Earl of Clanricarde, widow of Bryan Magennis, Viscount Iveagh. She is remembered by the Irish song Kilcash.

 
Thomas and Margaret had three sons:
 Richard (died 1711), who died of a fall from his horse at Kilcash
 Walter, who died of smallpox while at the Royal Academy of Painting and Sculpture in Paris
 John (died 1766), who became the de jure 15th Earl of Ormond and inherited the Ormond estate

—and five daughters:
 Mary, who married Bryan Kavanagh, of Borris, County Carlow
 Honora (died 1730), who married Valentine Browne, 3rd Viscount Kenmare, in 1720
 Hellen, who married firstly Captain Richard Esmond, brother of Sir Laurence Esmond, Baronet, and secondly, Richard Butler of Westcourt
 Margaret, who married George Matthew of Thurles, afterward of Thomastown
 Catharine, who became the third wife of James Mandeville of Ballydine, and had no issue. She married Richard Pascoe and had issue.

Grandfather's succession 
His father, Walter of Garryricken, died in 1700; his grandfather, Richard of Kilcash, followed in 1701. His father therefore predeceased his grandfather by a year. His grandfather's estate was the Garryricken Manor given to him in 1639. The manor's lands were divided between Thomas and his brother John. Thomas received Kilcash while John received Garryricken.

Death, succession, and timeline 
Thomas Butler died in 1738. He was succeeded by his son John, who would become the de jure 15th Earl of Ormond in 1658.

Notes and references

Notes

Citations

Sources 

 
  (for Garryricken)
 
 
  – N to R (for Ormonde)
  – Eardley of Spalding to Goojerat (for Fingall)
 
  – Scotland and Ireland
 
  – (for timeline)
  – Viscounts (for Butler, Viscount Mountgarret)
 
  – House of Lords

1738 deaths
Thomas
Irish soldiers
Irish soldiers in the army of James II of England
Year of birth unknown